Lidice is a municipality and village in Kladno District in the Central Bohemian Region of the Czech Republic. It has about 600 inhabitants.

Lidice is built near the site of the previous village, which was completely destroyed on 10 June 1942 on orders from Adolf Hitler and Reichsführer-SS Heinrich Himmler in reprisal for the assassination of Reich Protector Reinhard Heydrich.

Geography
It lies in a flat agricultural landscape of the Prague Plateau.

History

The first written mention of Lidice is from 1318. After the industrialisation of the area, many of its people worked in mines and factories in the neighbouring cities of Kladno and Slaný.

Lidice was chosen as a target for reprisals in the wake of the assassination of Reinhard Heydrich, because its residents were suspected of harbouring local resistance partisans, and were falsely associated with aiding team members of Operation Anthropoid. On 9 June 1942, 172 boys and men between age 14 to 84 were shot. Altogether, about 340 people from Lidice were murdered in the German reprisal (192 men, 60 women and 88 children). The village was set on fire and the remains of the buildings destroyed with explosives. After the war ended, only 153 women and 17 children returned. They were rehoused in a new village of Lidice that was built overlooking the original site, using money raised by the Lidice Shall Live campaign, initiated by Sir Barnett Stross and based in north Staffordshire in the United Kingdom. The first part of the new village was completed in 1949.

Evidence of the massacre, including Nazi propaganda videos, was shown at the Nuremberg Trials as a demonstration of the Nazi regime's violence. This included testimony from two of the surviving children, who were forcibly re-housed as part of the adoption process of Germanization.

Culture
An art gallery, which displays permanent and temporary exhibitions, is in the new village  from the museum. The annual children's art competition attracts entries from around the world.

In culture
In 1942, poet Edna St. Vincent Millay published "The Murder of Lidice," a dramatic poem commissioned by the Writers' War Board in the United States.

In 1943, the Czech composer Bohuslav Martinů wrote the musical work, .

In 1943, The British author Gerald Kersh lightly fictionalized the massacre in the short novel "The Dead Look On."

In 2017, to mark the 75th anniversary of the tragedy, the English composer Vic Carnall wrote his Opus 17, In Memoriam: the Village of Lidice (Czechoslovakia / June, 1942), a work for solo piano.

In recent years numerous films have highlighted the events of the village's razing in 1942. The 1975 film Operation Daybreak, 2011 film Lidice and Anthropoid from 2015 all detail the assassination of Reinhard Heydrich and the subsequent massacre and razing of the village.

Legacy
In remembrance of the Lidice massacre, many neighborhoods adopted the name Lidice in the years after the tragedy, and memorials were built. Notable examples include Lídice in Panama, San Jerónimo Lídice in Mexico, Lídice neighbourhood in La Pastora Parish of Caracas, Venezuela, Nova Lídice settlement in Medeiros Neto, Brazil, Lidice Memorial in Phillips, Wisconsin, Lidice Memorial Park in Crest Hill, Illinois, Plazuela Lidice town square in Montevideo, Uruguay, Lidic street in Santiago, Chile, and others.

Twin towns – sister cities

Lidice is twinned with:
 Coventry, England, United Kingdom. A pedestrianised shopping area in Coventry is named Lidice Place.
 Marzabotto, Italy. There is the Marzabottská street in Lidice.

See also

Lidice Massacre
"Lidice Shall Live!"

References

External links

Lidice Memorial

Villages in Kladno District
Razed cities